Elizabeth Schaw (died 1640) was a Scottish courtier.

Elizabeth was the daughter of Sir John Schaw of Broich and Arngomery, a niece of William Schaw, and a lady-in-waiting to Anne of Denmark. Another Elizabeth Schaw, a cousin, the wife of Henry Lindsay, 13th Earl of Crawford, was also a servant of Anne of Denmark.

She was an executor of her childless uncle William Schaw's property.

Her sister married Robert Mowbray, a grandson of the treasurer Robert Barton, and following his death she married James Colville of East Wemyss in 1601, which caused a family feud between Francis Mowbray, Robert's brother, and Schaw and Colville.

In the years before her marriage, at court in England, Anne of Denmark gave her gifts of her old clothing including five gowns, a satin doublet, and a skirt.

She married John Murray of the bedchamber and of Lochmaben, probably in 1611, and in England was known as Mrs Murray, and later Countess of Annandale. The couple were an important conduit for Scottish appeals to the King. Anne Livingstone, Countess of Eglinton, wrote to her in 1615, addressing the letter to "My Dear and loving Brother". The poet David Murray of Gorthy delivered the letters from London.

She returned to Scotland on leave from the household in 1613 and visited several places including Falkland Palace and stayed with her friend Marie Stewart, Countess of Mar at Alloa Tower. The lawyer Thomas Hamilton wrote to her husband, "she hopes to take well with her natural air, and nevertheless intends to make goodly haste to you, and to come as near the term appointed by her majesty as she may ... she must give this time to her friends who are desirous to salute and welcome her to the country."

In July 1615 she was involved in an incident in court politics when Henry Gibb, a new and minor servant of the king, delivered her a scandalous letter from Robert Carr, 1st Earl of Somerset, the Lord Chamberlain, for the queen. She sent news of this, and the queen's support for her and her husband, to the Countess of Eglinton.

King James authorised payment of her pension for attending Anna of Denmark on 14 November 1622.

She had three daughters. Their son James (d. 1658), later Earl of Annandale and Viscount Stormont, was baptised in the Chapel Royal at Holyrood Palace on 19 August 1617, William Couper preached and Anne Livingstone, Countess of Eglinton, presented the child.

References

Scottish countesses
Court of James VI and I
17th-century Scottish women
16th-century Scottish women
Scottish ladies-in-waiting
Ladies of the Bedchamber
Elizabeth
Clan Murray
Household of Anne of Denmark